G. Raymond Nye (April 13, 1889 – July 23, 1965) was an American film actor whose career began in silent era and lasted until the 1950s. He appeared in more than 110 films between 1912 and 1952.

Biography
Nye was born in Tamaqua, Pennsylvania.  He attended the University of Pennsylvania in Philadelphia.  He was noted for his striking appearance which consisted of dark brown hair and dark brown eyes.  After many years of stage acting, he settled in Los Angeles where he lived with his father, U.S. Grant Nye, in the Sunset Junction section of the Silver Lake neighborhood of town according to the 1920 census reports.  

On October 3, 1929, at age 40, Nye walked into his apartment to find his father had committed suicide by shooting himself in the head.  He also found an apology letter written by his father explaining that he was sorry for taking his own life and he couldn't "bear this physical condition." At 67 years old the elder Nye was suffering from the effects of three paralytic strokes.

Nye continued to appear in films until the 1950s.

Selected filmography

 The New Adventures of Terence O'Rourke (1915) - Prince Aziz
 The Passing of Hell's Crown (1916, Short) - Chuck Wells
 The Adventures of Peg o' the Ring (1916) - Big Bill Barnen
 Liberty (1916, Serial) - Pancho Lopez
 Is Any Girl Safe? (1916)
 When a Man Sees Red (1917) - Captain Sutton
 The Curse of Eve (1917) - Attorney
 The Kingdom of Love (1917) - Caribou Bill
 The Girl with the Champagne Eyes (1918) - Warren McKenzie
 True Blue (1918) - Hank Higgins
 Under the Yoke (1918) - Diablo Ramirez
 Play Straight or Fight (1918, Short) - Fred Osborne
 The Midnight Flyer (1918, Short) - Duke - Danny's Pal
 The Branded Man (1918, Short) - Val Heywood
 Salomé (1918) - King Herod
 Ali Baba and the Forty Thieves (1918) - Abdullah
 The Strange Woman (1918) - Walter Hemingway
 For Freedom (1918) - Bill Harris
 Mother, I Need You (1918)
 When Men Desire (1919) - Major Von Rohn
 The Jungle Trail (1919) - Ebano
 The Lone Star Ranger (1919) - Bully Brome
 Wolves of the Night (1919) - Slade
 The Last of the Duanes (1919) - Poggin
 The Broken Commandments (1919) - Berger
 Wings of the Morning (1919) - Mir Jan
 The Orphan (1920) - Bill Howland
 Sand! (1920) - Joseph Garber
 The Joyous Trouble-Makers (1920) - Bill Rice
 Drag Harlan (1920) - Luke Deveny
 The Scuttlers (1920) - Erickson
 While the Devil Laughs (1921) - 'Fence' McGee
 Oliver Twist, Jr. (1921) - Bill Sykes
 The Queen of Sheba (1921) - Adonijah
 Straight from the Shoulder (1921) - Big Ben Williams
 To a Finish (1921) - Bill Terry
 Pardon My Nerve! (1922) - Bill McFluke
 Bells of San Juan (1922) - Minor Role (uncredited)
 The Boss of Camp 4 (1922) - Dave Miller
 Snowdrift (1923) - Johnnie Claw (story)
 Salomy Jane (1923) - Red Pete
 The Ramblin' Kid (1923) - Mike Sabota
 Do It Now (1924)
 The Fighting Coward (1924) - Maj. Patterson
 Tiger Love (1924) - El Pezuño
 The Sawdust Trail (1924) - Gorilla Lawson
 The Saddle Hawk (1925) - Zach Marlin
 Let 'er Buck (1925) - James Ralston
 Nine and Three-Fifths Seconds (1925) - Link Edwards
 Driftin' Thru (1926) - Joe Walters
 The Devil's Skipper (1928) - Nick the Greek
 Tenderloin (1928) - Cowles
 The Devil Bear (1929) - Capt. Epsom
 The Last of the Duanes (1930) - Watson (uncredited)
 The Painted Desert (1931) - Bill (uncredited)
 The Hard Hombre (1931) - Joe Barlow
 The Deadline (1931) - Sheriff Grady
 A Man's Land (1932) - Pudge - Cowhand
 Heroes of the West (1932, Serial) - Railroad Worker [Ch. 3] (uncredited)
 The Reckless Rider (1932) - 'Wheezer' Bill
 The Boiling Point (1932) - Nick - Henchman
 The Big Stampede (1932) - Steele's Guard (uncredited)
 King Kong (1933) - Police Captain at Headquarters (uncredited)
 Somewhere in Sonora (1933) - Crooked Gambler (uncredited)
 Murder in the Private Car (1934) - Detective (uncredited)
 Les Misérables (1935) - Jacques (uncredited)
 Grand Exit (1935) - Al, the turnkey (uncredited)
 Escape from Devil's Island (1935) - Sergeant Major (uncredited)
 In Old Kentucky (1935) - Deputy Officer (uncredited)
 The Music Goes 'Round (1936) - Motorcycle Cop (uncredited)
 The King Steps Out (1936) - Secret Service Man (uncredited)
 The Man Who Lived Twice (1936) - Stoney - Fingerprint Man (uncredited)
 Git Along Little Dogies (1937) - Sheriff (uncredited)
 Eyes in the Night (1942) - Hugo (uncredited)
 Eadie Was a Lady (1945) - Policeman (uncredited)
 Where Do We Go from Here? (1945) - (uncredited)
 The Dolly Sisters (1945) - Tom (uncredited)
 Man in the Saddle (1951) - Townsman (uncredited)
 Carrie (1952) - Waiter (uncredited)

References

External links

1889 births
1965 deaths
American male film actors
American male silent film actors
Male actors from Pennsylvania
People from Tamaqua, Pennsylvania
University of Pennsylvania alumni
20th-century American male actors